Flowering Nettle is a partly autobiographical novel written by the Swedish Nobel laureate Harry Martinson in 1935 and first translated into English by Naomi Walford in 1936.

The book tells the story of the orphan child Martin, who is Harry Martinson's alter ego and is written from the perspective of the child. Martin's father dies and his mother leaves her children for a new life in California. Everything he holds dear disappear at a very early age and he grows up working in several farms and being sent away or going himself away, as he faces the harsh working life of the farmhand. Martin is described as a selfish, stupid, childish, selfpitying, obsequious, coward and false. Thus, there is no idealisation of the child.

The language in the novel has been described as knowingly childlike.

Flowering Nettle and its continuation The way out are partly autobiographical and show the hard and unsafe existence of an orphan child among the destitute in Sweden at the beginning of the 20th century.

References

Swedish literature
Swedish non-fiction literature
Works by Harry Martinson
Novels about orphans
1935 Swedish novels
Novels set in Sweden
Swedish-language novels